Time is the fifth studio album by Lionel Richie, released on June 23, 1998. It was a commercial disappointment, selling far fewer copies than any of his previous material.

Critical reception

Allmusic editor Stephen Thomas Erlewine found that Time "doesn't quite match the heights of Lionel Richie or Can't Slow Down, but it successfully updates his familiar concoction of sweet, seductive ballads and light funk for the late '90s. Whenever he incorporates light hip-hop rhythms here, it sounds less forced, and the dance numbers are often infectious. Similarly, the ballads have strong (albeit sappy) hooks that make them memorable [...] Time is the most satisfying effort he has released in quite some time." Los Angeles Times critic Connie Johnson found that "what Richie does best is create lush aural valentines – this album’s “Everytime” and “The Closest Thing to Heaven” are beautifully worded, personal-sounding testimonies. He stumbles, however, on his attempts at social commentary. A hybrid of Wyclef Jean and Bob Dylan he’s not, so tracks such as “To the Rhythm” are well-intended but lightweight and riddled with cliches."

Track listing

Personnel 
Credits adapted from the album's liner notes.

Performers and musicians

 Lionel Richie – lead vocals, keyboards (4-7)
 Michael Boddicker – synthesizers (1, 3-9, 11)
 Lloyd Tolbert – keyboards (1, 3-9, 11), drum programming (1, 3, 7, 8, 11), string arrangements and conductor (3)
 David Foster – keyboards (2, 10, 12), arrangements (2, 10), string arrangements (2), acoustic piano (12)
 Felipe Elgueta – synthesizer programming (2, 10, 12)
 John Hobbs – keyboards (4–6, 9)
 Dean Parks – guitars (2, 9, 10)
 Michael Thompson – guitars (3-6, 8, 10, 11, 12)
 Larry Byrom – guitars (4, 5, 6, 9)
 Jon Clark – guitars (8)
 Keith Rouster – bass (1, 3, 4, 6–8, 11)
 Joe Chemay – bass (4, 5, 9)
 Nathan East – bass (6, 12)
 John Robinson – drums (2, 12)
 Paul Leim – drums (4–6, 9)
 Guy Roche – drum and percussion programming (10)
 Munyungo Jackson – percussion (1, 3-9, 11)
 William Ross – string arrangements (2)
 James Anthony Carmichael – string arrangements and conductor (4, 5, 9), keyboards (5, 7)
 Ricky Jones – backing vocals (1, 3-9, 11)
 Marva King – backing vocals (1, 3-9, 11)
 Sherrie Woodward – backing vocals (2)
 Sue Ann Carwell – backing vocals (3, 6, 9)
 Jackie Smiley – backing vocals (3, 6, 9)
 Phyllis Williams – backing vocals (6)
 Da Boogie Man – poet vocals (7)
 Jeff Pescetto – backing vocals (10)

Technical and management

 Ralph Price Sutton – engineer (1, 3-9, 11, mixing (1, 3-9, 11, 12)
 Felipe Elgueta – engineer (2, 10, 12)
 David Reitzas – engineer (2, 12)
 Mick Guzauski – mixing (2, 10)
 Vlado Meller – mastering 
 Wherfore Art? – design 
 Peter Lindbergh – photography 
 David Croker – management 
 Melanie Greene – management
 John Reid – management

Charts

References

1998 albums
Lionel Richie albums
Mercury Records albums
Albums produced by James Anthony Carmichael
Albums produced by Lionel Richie